Qarah Aghaj-e Sofla (also Romanized as Qarah Āghāj-e Soflá; also known as Qarah Āqāj-e Soflá and Qareh Āqāj-e Soflá) is a village in Chaypareh-ye Pain Rural District, Zanjanrud District, Zanjan County, Zanjan Province, Iran. At the 2006 census, its population was 356, in 64 families.

References 

Populated places in Zanjan County